Antonios "Tony" Kontellis (Greek: Αντώνιος Κοντέλλης; born 1935), is a former Greek-Australian professional wrestler. 
Kontellis has worked for many wrestling promotions throughout his career, including WCW Australia and WWWF for Vince McMahon Sr.

Career 
Kontellis participated in the Greek team for the 1956 Olympics in Melbourne, Australia but a training injury forced him to withdraw. Travelling to South Australia to visit relatives, he was convinced to enter professional wrestling by a local wrestler. He was training in a gym when he was noticed by a visiting American wrestler, Lou Newman, who served as a mentor during Kontellis's early career. In 1957, Kontellis teamed with Norm Ryan to compete for the vacant Australian Tag Team Championship. They faced Jon and Frank Morro to determine the new champions but were unable to win the title belts.

In 1960, he travelled to Pakistan and feuded with King Kong Czaja before moving on to Canada. Whilst in Toronto, Ontario, Canada Kontellis wrestled for Frank Tunney's Maple Leaf Wrestling promotion. In 1966, Tony Kontellis returned to Australia and New Zealand, facing such wrestlers as Czaja, The Great Zorro, Wadi Ayoub and Steve Rickard.

In 1972, while in the WWWF, Kontellis wrestled opponents such as Joe Nova, Fred Curry and Jimmy Valiant. In 1974, Kontellis defeated Don Carson, Bill Dundee, Mr. Moto and Les Thornton while competing in Australia. He also won the Australasian Tag Team titles on 5 April with Pat Barrett by defeating George Barnes and Bobby Shane in a tournament final. Two weeks later, they dropped the title to Shane and Mr. Wrestling.

In 2003, Kontellis became a trainer for the World Wrestling Alliance wrestling school in Cabramatta, Sydney along with his son Paul and Libnan Ayoub. In 2007, Kontellis discontinued the school, and now resides in Sydney.

In 1996, Kontellis represented Greece at the Olympic Games in Atlanta. Kontellis faced noted Wrestler Kurt Angle in the final, however, ultimately went down in a narrow defeat, and therefore claiming the Silver medal.Months later, it was revealed that Angle completed the match with a broken freakin neck.

During the summer of 2001, Kontellis formed a successful tag-team partnership with crowd favourite Rikishi.
Kontellis and Rikishi famously claimed the Tag-Team championship in an epic TLC match with the Dudley Boyz.
The pair held the title for 6 months and successfully defended the belts on 8 separate occasions before Rikishi famously turned on Kontellis at Summerslam, hitting him with the infamous ‘Stink Face’ finisher.

Kontellis came out of retirement in 2008 and re-ignited his feud with King Kong Czaja in front out a capacity crowd at Acer Arena.Kontellis won 2 of the 3 encounters with Czaja that year, finally putting an end to a rivalry that spanned over half a century.
Kontellis was forced to medically retire at the ripe old age of 73 after being chokeslammed through a commentary table by the Big Show.

Championships and accomplishments
World Championship Wrestling (Australia)
NWA Austra-Asian Tag Team Championship - with Pat Barrett

References

External links 
Profile at Online World of Wrestling
Other Superstars - Tony Kontellis

1935 births
20th-century professional wrestlers
Greek male professional wrestlers
Australian male professional wrestlers
Greek emigrants to Australia
Living people
Sportspeople from Sydney
People from Lesbos
Sportspeople from the North Aegean
NWA Austra-Asian Tag Team Champions